The Cenarchaeales are an order of the Thermoproteota, a phylum of Archaea.

References

Further reading

Scientific journals

Scientific books

Scientific databases

External links

Archaea taxonomic orders
Thermoproteota